Habiba Mohamed Ahmed Alymohmed, is squash player who played on the Professional Squash Association (PSA) tour from 2011 to 2015. Her accomplishments as a player include five British Junior Open titles, four professional tournament wins and runner up in a further two professional events. She also recorded four wins against top 10 players. In fall 2017 she enrolled at Columbia University and plays on the women's team.

Early life and education 
Mohamed was born May 29, 1999, in Egypt and attended Riada International School in Alexandria, Egypt.  Her sister Farida Mohamed is also a professional squash player and, as of December 2019, was ranked #55 in the world.

Professional Tour Experience 
In 2013, as a 14 year old, Mohamed won the Malaysian Tour Grand Final, making her the youngest player ever to win a tour title.  She followed that up with titles at the 2014 Edinburgh and Paderborn Opens before she won the 2014 World Junior Championship, a tournament in which she defeated both Nour El Sherbini and Nouran Gohar.  Her first International 25k win came at the 2014 Atlantis Open where, as the 6th seed, she defeated Nour El Tayeb in an all-Egyptian final to take home the crown. 
Mohamed reached the final of the 2015 HKFC International tournament, losing to Annie Au. Her strong performance throughout her professional career lead to a #18 world ranking, making her the youngest ever to reach top 20 to date. Despite her very young age, Mohamed managed to beat world top 5 players making her one of the most successful female squash players.

Collegiate career 
For the 2017-2018 Columbia University college season, her first, she played primarily at the #5 position (of 9 players in a collegiate lineup) and recorded an 11–6 record in Ivy League play. The 2018–2019 season saw her playing at the number 2 and 3 positions. She was named as a Second Team All American for the 2018–2019 season. She began her third year (the 2019–2020 season) playing at the number one team position. For the 2019-2020 Columbia University college season, she played at the #1 position. She was the first ever Columbia Squash woman to be named as a First Team All American for the 2019–2020 season. Mohamed suffered serious knee and shoulder injuries during her collegiate career, yet she managed to become one of the best collegiate players and went undefeated in her final season.

Major Results

References

External links 

Egyptian female squash players
Living people
1999 births
Sportspeople from Alexandria
Columbia Lions women's squash players